Vavunathivu (Vavuna-thivu) is a town in Batticaloa District, Sri Lanka.  It is located about 5 km Southwest of Batticaloa or 15 km Northwest of Kokkadichcholai.

See also

Kokkadichcholai
1997 Vavunathivu Offensive

Towns in Batticaloa District
Manmunai West DS Division